Zoeterwoude is a municipality in the province of South Holland, Western Netherlands.

Located to the southeast of Leiden and north of Zoetermeer, the municipality of Zoeterwoude consists of Gelderswoude, Weipoort, Westeinde, Zoeterwoude-Dorp, Zoeterwoude-Rijndijk and Zuidbuurt.

Topography

Dutch topographic map of Zoeterwoude, Sept. 2014. Click to enlarge.

History

The name Zoeterwoude is first mentioned in a document from 1205, which references a certain "Florentius van Sotrewold". It is uncertain if this is a reference to the village. The first confirmed existence is from 1276 when Dirk van Santhorst received the "Soetrewold" fiefdom from Floris V, Count of Holland.

Its municipal boundaries were set circa 1300. At that time it was one of the largest municipalities in the Netherlands, but later much land was annexed by surrounding cities, notably Leiden. In 1450, the first bridge between Leiderdorp and Zoeterwoude was built. In 1574, Zoeterwoude was burnt to the ground and its polders inundated by Leideners in order to increase the range of the city's cannons. Almost no inhabitants remained in Zoeterwoude.

Around 1650, Zoeterwoude had been almost rebuilt and 50 years later it was prospering. After 1800, Leiden started a long series of annexations, reducing the land area of Zoeterwoude.

In 1960, the A4 motorway was built and since 1966 it has been the municipal boundary between Leiden and Zoeterwoude.

Economy 
A datacenter from SWIFT is located in Zoeterwoude.

The main brewery of Heineken International is located in Zoeterwoude.

Notable people of Zoeterwoude

 Lucretia Wilhelmina van Merken (1721-1789), dramatist and poet
 Harm Kamerlingh Onnes (1893–1985), portrait painter and ceramist
 Paul van Kempen (1893–1955), violinist and conductor
 Bram van Velde (1895–1981), fine-art painter
 Aar de Goede (1928–2016) politician

Sport 
 François Brandt (1874–1949) rower, competed at the 1900 Summer Olympics
 Jeroen Straathof (born 1972), cyclist and speed skater
 Suzanne de Goede (born 1984), cyclist

Gallery

References

External links 

 
Municipalities of South Holland
Populated places in South Holland